The Israeli Basketball State Cup is the second most important professional basketball competition in Israel, after the Israeli Super League. It is the national federation cup of Israel. The tournament began in the 1955–56 season, and is run by the Israel Basketball Association.

In the 21–22 season, the tournament format was changed so that only the first 8 teams at the end of the first rotation of the Israeli Basketball Premier League will compete. The quarter-final matches will be drawn between the teams in places 1-4 against 5-8 for a one-game elimination match. The winners advances to the semi-final matches which also consists of one game elimination match. the winners of the semi-final advances to the final match. Until the 21–22, The tournament format consists of teams from the Israeli Basketball Premier League and the National League facing each other for a one-game elimination match. The winner advances to the second round, which also consists of one game elimination match. The winner of the second round advances to the quarter-final stage.

Titles by team

Finals

Israeli State Cup Finals MVPs

References

External links
 Israel Basketball Association 

 
Basketball cup competitions in Europe